Luciane Buchanan (born 16 July 1993) is a New Zealand actress and filmmaker. She is known for her roles as Tripitaka (Tang Sanzang) in The New Legends of Monkey, Kennedy Truebridge in Filthy Rich and Billy T's daughter Cherie in Billy.

Early life and education
Buchanan was born and raised in Auckland. She is of Tongan and Scottish descent. She took acting classes at the Auckland Performing Arts Centre (TAPAC), some with Miranda Harcourt. She graduated with a Bachelor of Arts in Drama and Psychology from the University of Auckland in 2017.

Filmography

Film

Television

Web

References

External links

1993 births
Living people
21st-century New Zealand actresses
New Zealand film actresses
New Zealand television actresses
New Zealand web series actresses
New Zealand people of Scottish descent
New Zealand people of Tongan descent
People from Auckland
University of Auckland alumni